Corvair may refer to
Chevrolet Corvair, a compact car produced by General Motors from 1960 to 1969
Corvair Monza GT, a mid-engined experimental prototype car built for Chevrolet  in 1962
The Caledonia Corvairs (1961–2012), a Junior C ice hockey team
The Sky Corvair, a band led by Tim Kinsella
Corvair, a fictional spaceship from The Simpsons episode "Deep Space Homer"